Larisa Neiland and Natasha Zvereva were the defending champions, but lost in the final to Nicole Provis and Elna Reinach, 6–3, 6–3.

Seeds 
The top four seeds received a bye to the second round.

Draw

Finals

Top half

Bottom half

References

External links 
 ITF tournament edition details

Lufthansa Cup
WTA German Open
1991 in German tennis